These are the results of the 2001 United Kingdom general election in Northern Ireland. The election was held on 7 June 2001 and all 18 seats in Northern Ireland were contested. 1,191,009 people were eligible to vote, up 13,040 from the 1997 general election. 68.63% of eligible voters turned out, up 1.2 percentage points from the last general election.

The election resulted in a reduction in the share of vote and the number of seats won by the Ulster Unionist Party, though the UUP did remain the largest political party in Northern Ireland, and even managed to regain the seats of South Antrim after it was lost in a by-election in 2000 to the Democratic Unionist Party and North Down from the UK Unionist Party. The Social Democratic and Labour Party also suffered from a reduction in their share of the vote – ending in fourth place from second place at the last general election – though the SDLP did not lose any seats. Both the DUP and Sinn Féin increased their share of the vote as well as their number of seats.

Results

Below is a table summarising the results of the UK general election in Northern Ireland.

References

Northern Ireland
2001 in Northern Ireland
2001
June 2001 events in the United Kingdom
2001 elections in Northern Ireland